Netherlands benefits from a strategic geographic location, a world-class economy, a stable political climate, and a skilled workforce. The Netherlands has a large network of tax treaties, a low corporate income tax rate and a full participation exemption for capital gains and profits. These characteristics, in addition to a favorable tax environment, make Netherlands one of the most open economies in the world for multinational corporations (MNCs).

Overview 

Corporate tax in the Netherlands deals with the tax payable in the Netherlands on the profits earned by companies. For tax purposes, a company formed under Dutch law is considered a resident of the Netherlands and personal and business income taxes are levied in the Netherlands on worldwide income earned by tax residents. Non-residents who operate a business in the Netherlands are subject to personal or corporate income tax in the Netherlands. As of January 1, 2022, the normal Corporate Income Tax Rate (CIT) rate is 25.8 percent (25 percent in 2021). There are two income tax brackets. The first income bracket is subject to a lower rate of 15%. This tax level has been increased to EUR 395,000 in taxable income (EUR 245,000 in 2021). The excess of taxable income is taxed at the usual rate.

Profits earned by both public and private enterprises are normally subject to corporate income tax. Foundations and associations may be required to file corporate income tax reports in specific circumstances. Certain types of income, however, can be exempted or excluded from the tax base. When it comes to income from Dutch sources, non-resident entities only have a limited tax liability. Corporate income tax is not paid by some legal entities, such as fiscal investment institutions. Some legal entities may be free from corporate income tax if they invest jointly. 

Dividends distributed by Dutch resident corporations with capital divided into shares are subject to a withholding tax in the Netherlands. The general rate of dividend withholding tax that Dutch resident corporations are generally subject to pay is 15%. A double taxation treaty can lower the withholding tax rate for international receivers. Furthermore, dividends may be free from taxation in the Netherlands, subject to anti-abuse rules, if both of the following conditions are met:

 The receiver of the dividends dispensed by the Dutch corporation is a resident of the European Union, the European Economic Area, or another nation with which the Netherlands has signed a tax treaty involving a dividend article (provided that the corporation is not treated as a tax resident of another nation as a result of a tax treaty between the two countries).
 The recipient of the dividends is a resident of the Netherlands

The Netherlands has committed to accept the minimum criteria (primary purposes test and dispute resolution) as well as some optional aspects of the Multilateral Convention to Implement Tax Treaty Related Measures to Prevent Base Erosion and Profit Shifting (MLI).

A value-added tax (VAT) is levied in addition to income tax in compliance with EU Directives. The final burden of VAT is borne by the end consumer. This goal is met by subtracting the amount of input VAT paid on supplies by an entrepreneur from the amount of output VAT charged on goods or services supplied or rendered by the business. The tax authorities in the Netherlands should be paid the positive balance.

Dutch Tax and Customs Administration 
The Dutch Tax and Customs Administration (Belastingdienst) is in charge of administrating the Netherlands' tax system, and it operates through a network of regional offices and centralized information centers. The Dutch tax authorities treat taxpayers with professionalism and cooperation. Qualifying corporate taxpayers can participate in a horizontal monitoring program, which is a cooperative compliance program. A covenant is reached between a taxpayer and the Dutch tax authorities under the horizontal monitoring program, in which the taxpayer pledges to providing information proactively and discusses any concerns in advance during frequent meetings with the Dutch tax inspector. The goal is to give the taxpayer more certainty about his or her tax situation in the Netherlands.

Ahead-of-time certainty is also available in the shape of an advance tax ruling. Only enterprises with a substantial economic connection with the country can get a tax ruling. For this to happen, the firm requesting the ruling should be a member of a group that performs economic operational activities in the Netherlands, and these economic operational activities should be undertaken by or for the company's account and risk. If the other jurisdictions concerned in the ruling are members of the EU or are parties to a treaty with the Netherlands that allows for information exchange, information on the ruling will be automatically shared with the tax authorities in other jurisdictions.

History of corporate tax rates

From 1981 to 2021, the corporate tax rate in the Netherlands has decreased by about half. It peaked at 48 percent in 1982 and fell to a new low of 25 percent in 2011. The corporate tax rate dropped massively from 35 percent to 29.5 percent in 2006, and further to 25.5 percent in 2007. In 2006, the corporate local tax rate was decreased from 15% to 10%, and then to 5.5 percent in 2007. As a result, the absolute tax rates were reduced by 5.5 percent in 2006 and by 4 percent in 2007. Companies can save money on taxes by transferring income tax from 2006 or 2007 to a later year. As a result, executives can defer income tax to a lower tax tariff cycle. This tax reform, in theory, encouraged management to manage earnings in order to reduce tax payments. 

The 2019 Dutch corporate tax rate was 19% of the taxable income up to and including (euro) € 200,000, above which the rate was 25%. The lower rate decreased to 16.5% in 2020. In 2021 the rate for the first bracket further decreased to 15% with taxable income up to € 245,000. The top Dutch corporate tax rate instead remained stable at 25%. As of 2022, the corporate tax rate stands at 15% for income below €395,000, above which the rate was 25.8%. These rates have been lowered by the Dutch government to stimulate a competitive tax environment for international businesses.

Exemptions
Certain items of income are exempt from Dutch corporate tax. The most important items of income that are exempt are:

 capital gains and dividends derived from qualifying subsidiaries ("participation exemption")
 income attributable to a foreign business enterprise ("permanent establishment").

Participation exemption
Capital gains, dividends and profit participation loan interest derived from a qualifying subsidiary are fully exempt from corporate tax in the Netherlands ("participation exemption"). A subsidiary qualifies for the Dutch participation exemption when:

 the subsidiary is an active company, and
 the Dutch parent company holds an interest of at least 5% of such company.

Foreign branch
Any income received by a Dutch company from a foreign branch is exempt from Dutch corporate tax, provided such branch is a permanent establishment or representative.

Anti-abuse clause
The Dutch Corporate income tax regulations have included a great many anti-avoidance clauses since 1969, to avoid abuse of the tax rules by corporations. There have been implemented anti abuse clauses for the participation exemption, interest deductions for hybrid loans and recently for the dividend withholding tax act.

Tax haven

The Netherlands has been known internationally, since at least the 1970s, as a tax haven. A political debate about this issue started in 1977, when economist and social-democratic MP Flip de Kam published a book about corporations transferring large sums to Caribbean countries without paying Dutch corporate tax. Minister Van der Stee admitted that the country was internationally known as a tax haven, but refused to act, arguing that the problem could not be solved on a national level alone. The debate raged for years; in 1986, Representative Willem Vermeend estimated that the country's tax service missed some ƒ4 billion per year due to companies such as The Rolling Stones' holding bv's using the "Caribbean route".

Dutch tax laws have brought the country into conflict with the European Union several times, starting with strong criticism in the 1999 Primarolo Report. The Dutch government responded by having a group of high-ranking fiscal experts (known with the Ministry of Finance as the "Barbapapa group") create a smoke screen, changing the appearance of the fiscal system while leaving its structure intact.

Starting 2009, the "tax haven" label resurfaced and sparked political controversy when the White House issued a press release in which the Netherlands was mentioned as tax haven.
According to various NGO's the Netherlands "can be seen as an intermediary tax haven for foreign corporations". In February 2013, the Dutch House of Representatives accepted a motion calling on cabinet members to "reject, and where possible in discussions to insist on not mentioning" the qualification of the country as a tax haven; the motion was drafted by MP Roland van Vliet, a former tax advisor with Ernst & Young.
Economist  estimated that at the time of the motion, the state earned some €1.5 billion in tax from €12 trillion being transferred through the country annually.

, the country harbors holding companies for various multinationals, participates in more than a hundred bilateral tax treaties, and the various exemptions facilitate tax avoidance by corporations. A notable example is most of the holdings of the Agnelli family which are incorporated there.

In June 2014 the EU initiated a new investigation relating to the Dutch corporate taxes as part of a State aid (European Union) case by the Directorate General for Competition. The case was specific to Starbucks. 
The investigation ended in October 2015, with the EC ordering Starbucks to pay up to €30 million in overdue taxes. The EC exposed in its decision a legal structure commonly used by companies established in the Netherlands to avoid corporate taxation, the so called Dutch BV-CV structure.
In 2017, the EU initiated another State aid (European Union) investigation into a special deal on corporate taxation between the Dutch public administration and IKEA.

National and foreign companies known to have special agreements with the Dutch tax service include Starbucks, Microsoft and PostNL. A 2015 FOI request by de Volkskrant to unearth the agreements failed, because these secret agreements are not centrally administered by the Tax and Customs Administration; with even the House of Representatives not having access to them.

See also
 Taxation in the Netherlands

References

External links
Dutch Tax and Customs Administration

Taxation in the Netherlands
Netherlands